Miami Community Church (also known as Miami Presbyterian Church; Community Presbyterian Church ; Divine Grace Presbyterian Church) is a church at 305 W. Live Oak Street in Miami, Arizona.

It was built in 1920 and added to the National Register of Historic Places in 2005.

See also

 List of historic properties in Miami, Arizona

References

External links
 

Presbyterian churches in Arizona
Churches on the National Register of Historic Places in Arizona
Churches completed in 1920
Churches in Gila County, Arizona
National Register of Historic Places in Gila County, Arizona